Jerry's Enterprises, Inc. is an operator of County Market, Cub Foods, Jerry's Foods and Save-a-Lot grocery stores headquartered in Edina, Minnesota.  Jerry's Foods is the largest Cub Foods franchise in the United States and runs 20 retail supermarkets in the Twin Cities, 2 in Wisconsin and 10 in Florida.

Additionally Jerry's owns 4 Liquor stores (two operating as Cub Liquor), 5 Hardware stores, and 2 Print Shops, as well as additional property interests.

Jerry's Enterprises was founded in 1947 by CEO Gerald A. (Jerry) Paulsen.

Acquisitions

In 2004, the company expanded into Wisconsin with the purchase of two County Market stores from Dick Schmitz, a Hudson businessman, for an undisclosed price. In 2014, Jerry's purchased 7 Rainbow Foods stores from Roundy's, a Milwaukee company. 4 converted into Cub Foods and 3 remained Rainbow until they were converted or closed. All are located in Minnesota.

References

External links

 Jerry's Foods

Companies based in Edina, Minnesota
American companies established in 1947
Retail companies established in 1947
Supermarkets of the United States